Bailey's Crossroads is a census-designated place (CDP) in Fairfax County, Virginia, United States. The population was 24,749 at the 2020 census. Bailey's Crossroads lies at the crossroads of State Route 7 (Leesburg Pike) and State Route 244 (Columbia Pike).

Etymology
Bailey's Crossroads draws its name from the Bailey family of circus fame, which has long been connected with the community. Hachaliah Bailey, one of America's first circus showmen, resided here. In 1808, while still in New York state, he purchased an Indian elephant which was one of the first such animals to reach the United States. Seeking a place to winter his circus animals, he moved to Virginia, and on December 19, 1837, he bought a tract of land on the outskirts of Falls Church including what is now the intersection of Leesburg Pike and Columbia Pike. On this tract he built a large house known as "Bailey's Mansion" or "Moray;" it was reputed to have contained 100 rooms. The mansion sat at a location now known as Durbin Place. It abutted Glenforest Drive, the oldest outlet road to Leesburg Pike.

Circuses were part of the Bailey family business. Hachaliah's son Lewis Bailey (1795–1870) operated a travelling circus and pioneered the use of canvas circus tents before eventually settling in 1840 to farm land in Bailey's Crossroads. Hachaliah's nephew George F. Bailey managed several shows, too, designing a tank in which a hippopotamus could be moved from place to place. Another nephew, Fred Harrison Bailey, recognized a potential circus talent in James Anthony McGuiness, later James Anthony Bailey, who united the Cooper and Bailey with Phineas Taylor Barnum's circus to form the Barnum and Bailey Circus, which later joined with the Ringling Brothers Circus to form the Ringling Brothers and Barnum and Bailey Circus.

Perhaps the first of the Northerners to settle permanently in Fairfax County to farm was Lewis Bailey, an upstate New Yorker and the son of Hachaliah Bailey, who followed his father south.  In 1837, the elder Bailey bought hundreds of acres of Fairfax land, much of it on the outskirts of present-day Arlington County in the area now known as Baileys Cross Roads.  Shortly afterward, Lewis Bailey bought  of land from his father for ten dollars an acre.  Included in the purchase was "a good dwelling-house," but there were "no other buildings of value, and little or no fence."  The farm itself, he wrote later, consisted of "cultivated worn-out lands, too poor to produce a crop of grass, or pay for cultivation without manure."  Some of Bailey's neighbors considered the farm the poorest in the vicinity.  When he built his first small barn, twenty-four by thirty-six feet, they asked him if he "ever expected to fill it."  The question was scarcely a jest, for Bailey did not make enough hay the first year "to winter two horses." Nevertheless, the purchase was a wise one.  Within a decade Bailey had a fine herd of dairy cattle and had become one of the more prosperous farmers in the area. The Baileys were prominent members of the Dulin Methodist Church, and intermarried with many Falls Church people

History 

Hachaliah Bailey (the founder of one of America's earliest circuses, which in time evolved into the Bailey component of what became the Ringling Bros. and Barnum & Bailey Circus) moved to Northern Virginia in 1837, bought the land surrounding the intersection of Leesburg Pike and Columbia Pike in Fairfax County, Virginia near Falls Church, Virginia, and gave Bailey's Crossroads his name. The Crossroads then became the winter quarters for his circus.

Civil War

The opening months of the American Civil War proved to be a disruptive and unforgettable episode in the history of Bailey's Crossroads.  From the summer of 1861, when the area fell into an uncomfortable and poorly defined "no man's land" between the borders of two warring countries, until late November of that year, when the area hosted a massive troop review, anything akin to normalcy was in short supply.

Virginia voted to secede from the Union on May 23, 1861.  Fairfax County's northern-born residents—many of whom were its most prominent and prosperous citizens—now felt very uncomfortable.  Their southern neighbors looked upon them with suspicion.  In July 1861 the Union Army met with catastrophic defeat during the First Battle of Manassas.  The army retreated all the way to Washington, with the Confederate Army advancing quickly behind it.  The Confederates occupied Falls Church and Munson's Hill, overlooking Bailey's Crossroads, and the crossroads' northern-born residents fled for the safety of Washington.

Once Confederates established themselves atop Munson's Hill they built a crude fort there, and from these commanding heights turned Bailey's Crossroads into a "killing field".  Southern sharpshooters killed numerous Union soldiers.  Violence arose whenever Confederate and Union pickets, or scouts, engaged one another in firefights.  It was now impossible to walk the Leesburg Pike without being shot and killed.

There was a minor engagement between the sides on Tuesday, September 3, 1861, with the Union suffering 8 casualties and the Confederates none.

And further, the official reports on the 'War of the Rebellion' indicate that during August 28–30, 1861 a series of skirmishes took place at a location scrawled as "Balley's Cross Roads".

The local balance of power changed completely—and to everyone's surprise—on September 28, 1861, as the Confederate Army silently withdrew its forces from Munson's Hill, Upton's Hill and Falls Church to Manassas, which they fortified.  Munson's Hill and Falls Church were located too far afield of reliable supply lines, and a concerted Union pincer movement could possibly choke off supplies, the Southern command believed.  At Manassas they were adjacent to Virginia's interior, and had good railroad and road connections to it.

After Confederate withdrawal the area quickly was reoccupied by Union troops.  A significant troop review took place at Bailey's Crossroads on November 20, 1861.  Thousands of Union troops marched in formation and paraded before President Abraham Lincoln, the northern press, and many onlookers from Washington.  Army commanders selected Bailey's Crossroads as the site because of its nature as a large, unbroken plain.  In order to prepare it for the day's activities the army merely needed to remove the split-rail fencing separating farms and fields.

During recent years local historians have confused this review with another, smaller review held on nearby Upton's Hill, where events spurred the composition and publication of the Battle Hymn of the Republic.

Modern era

After the Civil War Bailey's Crossroads returned to its pastoral pre-war pursuits.  The area remained a rural farming community until the post-World War II years, when a massive wave of development occurred.  Leesburg Pike is now a commercial corridor, with apartments and homes to its north and south.  A strip shopping center called Culmore, in particular, has lent its name to the apartment development behind it, which is now home to several thousand Latino immigrants.  "Culmore" is now an established place name within Bailey's Crossroads. Close behind Culmore is Lake Barcroft, whose shore is lined with upscale middle-class homes.

During the 1960s, as Washington's Metro system was being conceived, original plans called for a subway line to extend under Columbia Pike to and through Bailey's Crossroads.  As a result of the plan a massive highrise complex was built on the former Washington-Virginia Airport in the heart of Bailey's Crossroads called Skyline City.  Its location coincided with the planned locations of Metro stations.  Plans for the Metro, however, changed.  The western line was placed along the I-66 corridor instead.

Geography

Bailey's Crossroads is located at  (38.849474, -77.129093).

According to the United States Census Bureau, the CDP has a total area of 2.0 square miles (5.3 km2), all of it land.  The area occupies a broad, flat plain, bounded on the west by Munson's Hill.  This unbroken expanse of level ground caused the Union Army to select it as the site of a massive review of troops during the Civil War.  The review, which took place on November 20, 1861, involved thousands of troops marching in formation and parading before President Abraham Lincoln.

Bailey's Crossroads is formed by the junction of State Route 7 connecting Alexandria, Virginia with the Shenandoah Valley and State Route 244 (Columbia Pike) connecting the Pentagon and Washington, D.C., with Annandale, Virginia. The most noticeable landmark at Bailey's Crossroads is Skyline Center, a towering group of 26-story apartment buildings and offices built in the 1970s. A branch of Northern Virginia Community College, and offices of the U.S. Department of Defense are nearby. The neighborhood has a large Hispanic population. The largest single store of the entire Giant Food supermarket chain is also there. While the closest Metrorail station is a few miles away, Metrobus service on the Columbia Pike corridor has recently been improved.

The precise extent of Bailey's Crossroads has never been defined.  As an unincorporated community without local government, it has never had the purview to do so.  The United States Census Bureau observes one definition; and various parts of the Fairfax County government observe others.  Economic development plans tend to include just the commercial corridors and associated areas.  Current discussions among the Fairfax County government for revitalizing Bailey's Crossroads economically concern themselves with the Fairfax County border on the north and east—which generally includes all commercial and residential properties generally considered as belonging to the neighborhood—as well as Seminary Road and Carlin Spring Road.  The plans include a narrow strip along Leesburg Pike to Glen Carlyn Road.

As a general neighborhood, however, with all facets of life included, the geographic extent of Bailey's Crossroads must be considered to be larger.  It abuts the clearly established Lake Barcroft neighborhood on the southwest, with Blair Road, Beachway Drive, Nevius Street and Mansfield Road marking its western proximity.  North of Leesburg Pike its extent is generally defined by Glen Carlyn and Carlin Springs roads.

Governance 
Fairfax County Public Schools operates public schools.  Glen Forest Elementary School is the primary school attended by most children living in the area, and the local schools feed Justice High School.

Fairfax County Public Library operates the Woodrow Wilson Library in the Culmore area.  It has Spanish-language materials in addition to English-language ones.

A United States Post Office, located in Culmore, serves the Bailey's Crossroads ZIP code of 22041.  Although, the United States Postal Service uses "Falls Church" as the primary name of the ZIP code, mail can also be addressed using "Bailey's Crossroads", as many businesses and residents do to prevent confusion with services, deliveries, customers and guests. The State of Virginia  and Fairfax County, Virginia recognize "Bailey's Crossroads" as a valid address for official documents such as property deed, vehicle registration, drivers license and other business.

In 2010, the Bailey's Crossroads Volunteer Fire Department turned the land, the firehouse, and most of the equipment of Fire Station 10 over to the Fairfax County Fire & Rescue Department in exchange for a new facility. Since then, Fire Station 10 has been maintained and operated by the Fairfax County Fire & Rescue Department and is staffed 24/7 by full-time career firefighters and paramedics. The Bailey's Crossroads Volunteer firefighters still own the three medic units housed at the station - the two front line units are maintained and operated by Fairfax County Fire & Rescue, while the third unit is maintained and operated by the volunteers.

Demographics

As of the census of 2000, there were 23,166 people, 8,547 households, and 4,965 families residing in the community. The population density was 11,276.0 people per square mile (4,363.1 per km2). There were 8,813 housing units at an average density of 4,289.7 per sq mile (1,659.9 per km2). The racial makeup of the community was 47.90% White, 10.85% African American, 0.54% Native American, 12.37% Asian, 0.09% Pacific Islander, 18.73% from other races, and 9.51% from two or more races. Hispanic or Latino of any race were 39.05% of the population (11.5% Salvadoran, 7.4% Guatemalan, 4.4% Bolivian, 4.3% Mexican, 2.5% Honduran, 1.2% Peruvian, 0.8% Nicaraguan).

There were 8,547 households, out of which 29.5% had children under the age of 18 living with them, 40.4% were married couples living together, 11.2% had a female householder with no husband present, and 41.9% were non-families. 33.3% of all households were made up of individuals, and 10.4% had someone living alone who was 65 years of age or older. The average household size was 2.70 and the average family size was 3.40.

In the CDP, the population was spread out, with 23.0% under the age of 18, 10.6% from 18 to 24, 37.1% from 25 to 44, 19.0% from 45 to 64, and 10.3% who were 65 years of age or older. The median age was 33 years. For every 100 females, there were 106.3 males. For every 100 females age 18 and over, there were 106.3 males.

The median income for a household in the community was $51,650, and the median income for a family was $51,490. Males had a median income of $35,130 versus $34,265 for females. The per capita income for the community was $24,091. About 10.7% of families and 13.3% of the population were below the poverty line, including 18.4% of those under age 18 and 5.2% of those age 65 or over.

In popular culture 

 Bailey's Crossroads is featured in The Man in the High Castle.

Notable people
Charlie Garner, former American football player
Franz Stahl and Pete Stahl, punk rock musicians
Penny Moore, former WNBA basketball player

See also
 Skyline Towers collapse
 Washington-Virginia Airport
"History at the Crossroads" (Washington Post, May 19, 2002)

References

Census-designated places in Fairfax County, Virginia
Washington metropolitan area
Census-designated places in Virginia
1837 establishments in Virginia
Populated places established in 1837